Cyto (formerly Cyto's Puzzle Adventure) is a casual physics based puzzle mobile game developed by Ukrainian game development studio Room 8. The game was first released on the iOS App Store on February 21, 2013.

Gameplay
The main goal of this game is to help Cyto recover his lost memories by collecting memory fragments through numerous levels of gameplay across various worlds. Cyto has a gelatinous envelope that deforms and stretches when player touches it.

Reception

Reviews for Cyto were mostly positive. Eli Cymet of Toucharcade said that "it'll be a delight for your left and right brain alike". Alberto González of Vandal.net stated: "it's addictive and accessible, two good reasons to give it a try".

Awards
In December 2012, Cyto won the prize for "Best future mobile game" on the FlashGamm Kyiv 2012 Game Conference.

References

2013 video games
Android (operating system) games
Chillingo games
IOS games
MacOS games
Single-player video games
Video games about amnesia
Video games developed in Ukraine
Video games scored by David Ari Leon
Windows games